The 2022 Georgia's Rome Challenger was a professional tennis tournament played on indoor hard courts. It was the first edition of the tournament which was part of the 2022 ATP Challenger Tour. It took place in Rome, Georgia, United States between 11 and 17 July 2022.

Singles main draw entrants

Seeds

 1 Rankings as of June 27, 2022.

Other entrants
The following players received wildcards into the singles main draw:
  Michael Mmoh
  Govind Nanda
  Sam Riffice

The following player received entry into the singles main draw as a special exempt:
  Juan Pablo Ficovich

The following players received entry into the singles main draw as alternates:
  Hady Habib
  Shintaro Mochizuki

The following players received entry from the qualifying draw:
  Strong Kirchheimer
  Patrick Kypson
  Michail Pervolarakis
  Shang Juncheng
  Ben Shelton
  Donald Young

Champions

Singles 

  Wu Yibing def.  Ben Shelton 7–5, 6–3.

Doubles 

  Enzo Couacaud /  Andrew Harris def.  Ruben Gonzales /  Reese Stalder 6–4, 6–2.

References

Georgia's Rome Challenger
Georgia's Rome Challenger
July 2022 sports events in the United States